John James Edens (June 30, 1840 – December 24, 1914) was an American politician in the state of Washington. He served in the Washington State Senate from 1889 to 1895.

References

Republican Party Washington (state) state senators
1840 births
1914 deaths
People from Marshall County, Kentucky
19th-century American politicians